Frans Geerts or Augustinus Franciscus Maria (Frans) Geerts (14 September 1869 in Antwerp – 30 June 1957 in Borgerhout) was a Belgian painter.

Life
Little is known about the life of Frans Geerts. From 1880 to 1886, he attended painting courses at the Royal Academy of Fine Arts in Antwerp. Taught by renowned still life painter Lucas Victor Schaefels, he excelled in his class, winning the contest "ornement au trait d’après l’estampe" in 1884. The last months of his painters’ education coincided with the short and unsuccessful attendance of Vincent van Gogh at the Antwerp Academy.

No records have been found of Geerts’ activity in the decade after his education. He may have received additional training abroad or perfected his art in another artist's workshop. He married Anna Maria Maes in 1891 and they had a daughter. From the end of the 19th century until the end of the second World War, he lived and worked as an artist in Borgerhout, Antwerp, where he died in 1957.

Work

Frans Geerts’ work is very diverse. He painted realistic and romantic portraits, pastoral and religious scenes, and still lifes with flowers and landscapes. He predominantly made oil paintings, but also watercolors and ink drawings.

Apart from original paintings, his works include numerous creative adaptations of well-known artists' works, such as Adriaen Brouwer, Václav Brožík, Henri De Braekeleer, and David Teniers II. Geerts also painted a detailed copy of Pieter Bruegel the Elder’s The Peasant Dance.

Geerts was no avant-garde artist and never played a prominent role in Antwerp's artistic scene. Nevertheless, he seems to have had a certain commercial success. His works are held in private collections and regularly appear at auctions in Belgium and abroad.

References

Sources 
 P. & V. Berko, Dictionary of Belgian painters born between 1750 & 1875, Brussel, 1981, p. 304.

External links 
 Profile of François Geerts in the database of the Duch Institute for Art History (RKD)

1869 births
1957 deaths
19th-century Belgian painters
19th-century Belgian male artists
20th-century Belgian painters
20th-century Belgian male artists